Hukill Run is a  long 1st order tributary to Buffalo Creek in Brooke County, West Virginia.  It is likely named for the landowner that owns the confluence of this run and Buffalo Creek.

Course
Hukill Run rises about 2 miles east of Power, West Virginia, and then flows east to join Buffalo Creek about 2 miles west-northwest of Bethany.

Watershed
Hukill Run drains  of area, receives about 40.1 in/year of precipitation, has a wetness index of 293.62, and is about 68% forested.

See also
List of rivers of West Virginia

References

Rivers of West Virginia
Rivers of Brooke County, West Virginia